The Liberty of Glasshouse Yard was an extra-parochial liberty  adjacent to the City of London. The liberty took its name from a glass manufacturing works established there. The area now forms part of the London Borough of Islington.

Formation
This area was originally part of the parish of St Botolph without Aldersgate. Most of that parish lay within the medieval, near fixed, boundaries of the City of London, with the main exception being this northernmost area in the adjoining county of Middlesex. Over the centuries housing and the population of this portion increased such that it became by the 18th century an overwhelmingly urban extension of London of roughly the same density as the south. The Yard's own administration was formed, (board of trustees), when the Act for the Relief of the Poor 1601 (Elizabethan Poor Law) was introduced.

The Glasshouse
The name and date of establishment of the liberty (1601) attest to its "glass-house" or glass-making factory, recorded in later decades. This status coincided with the reign of Elizabeth I, whose government pursued a policy of encouraging new industries, exempting them from onerous tithes. High fire risk (and noxious industries such as tanning, dyeing and slaughterhouses) were banned from the City so such industries occupied the area immediately adjoining it. By 1661 the factory was manufacturing crystal glass. By 1700 production appears to have ended.

Extent

The Liberty of Glasshouse Yard was bounded to the south by the (many parishes of the) City, to the west by the parish of St Sepulchre to the northeast by the Liberty of Charterhouse and to the north and north west by the parish of St Luke's.

Governance

Finsbury division
The liberty formed part of Ossulstone Hundred, one of six divisions of Middlesex primarily used for taxation assessment purposes after the mid medieval period as the powers of the King's courts and each parish vestry superseded those of manorial courts and especially the Hundred Court.  Ossulstone was the hundred nearest the city, and saw great population growth. By the 17th century the hundred divided and further empowered into divisions, and Glasshouse Yard became part of the Finsbury Division.

Poor law
The liberty was a separate jurisdiction from the remainder of the parish of St Botolph for the administration of the poor law, and by the early eighteenth century the chief officer was known as the "headborough". The Poor Law Amendment Act 1834 allowed for the grouping of parishes into Poor Law Unions, with a single workhouse established in each union. In 1837 Glasshouse Yard was included in the East London Poor Law Union, which comprised the City parishes of St Botolph, Aldersgate, St Botolph, Aldgate, St Botolph, Bishopsgate and St Giles, Cripplegate. A board of guardians of twenty members was formed, with 2 being elected from the parish of St Botolph Aldersgate. The union built a workhouse at Homerton in 1852.

The Poor Law Amendment Act 1866 provided that all areas for which a separate poor rate was made were to be constituted as parishes, and accordingly Glasshouse Yard became a distinct civil parish separate from its mother parish.
In 1869 the East London PLU was merged with two other unions to form the City of London Poor Law Union, covering 118 parishes. In 1901 Glasshouse Yard was transferred to the Holborn Poor Law Union.

Holborn District Board
The Metropolis Management Act 1855  introduced the first modern local government bodies to govern the built-up area of London. The act introduced two tiers of administration: the Metropolitan Board of Works (MBW) which was to undertake major infrastructure projects with below it a lower level of incorporated parish vestries or district boards. District boards covered two or more parishes and consisted of a number of elected vestrymen from each constituent parish, the number depending on population. The Holborn District Board of Works covered five Middlesex parishes and consisted of forty-nine vestrymen, of which one represented Glasshouse Yard. The first elections were held in November 1855, when the entire membership of the board was elected. Thereafter elections for one third of the seats were held in May, beginning in the year 1857.

In 1889 the area of the Metropolitan Board became the County of London, and the London County Council replaced the MBW. The district board continued to exist for a further eleven years.

Metropolitan Borough of Finsbury
The London Government Act 1899 abolished the vestries and district boards within the County of London, replacing them with twenty-eight metropolitan boroughs. On 1 November 1900 Glasshouse Yard became part of the Metropolitan Borough of Finsbury which also consisted of the parishes of Charterhouse, Clerkenwell, St Luke and St Sepulchre. Glasshouse Yard was formally abolished in 1915 when the five parishes in the borough were merged into a single parish of Finsbury.

Modern development
The area once occupied by the liberty has been extensively redeveloped since the Second World War. A modern street named Glasshouse Yard has been constructed to the west of Goswell Road and adjacent to the Golden Lane Estate.

References

Parishes united into districts (Metropolis)
History of the London Borough of Islington
Former civil parishes in London
Liberties of London